The 1983 FIA European Endurance Championship for Drivers was the seventh season and third iteration of the European Sportscar Championship auto racing series.  It was contested by drivers competing in Group C sports cars, Group C Junior sports cars, and Group B GT cars in eight race events from 10 April to 23 October 1983.  Frenchmen Bob Wollek won the championship driving for the Sorga S.A. Porsche team.

The European championship was held in conjunction with the 1983 World Endurance Championship, sharing the first five race events before departing for outside Europe.  As such, many drivers and teams competed in both championships.

Schedule
The first five events were shared with the World Endurance Championship. The Monza round was shared with the Italian Championship Group 6, although their race lasted only 14 laps and the cars did not complete the full endurance race distance.

Entries

Group C

Group C Junior

Group B
The Nürburgring round allowed additional Group B entries meeting the under  regulations to compete but they were not eligible for championship points and are therefore not listed here.

Results and standings

Race results

Drivers' championship
Drivers were awarded points for finishes in the top ten positions in each overall race classification.  All three classes competed for the same points in overall classification, but Group C Junior and Group B competitors were awarded additional points for any finish in the overall top ten.

1983 in motorsport